Earnings per share (EPS) is the monetary value of earnings per outstanding share of common stock for a company. It is a key measure of corporate profitability and is commonly used to price stocks.

In the United States, the Financial Accounting Standards Board (FASB) requires EPS information for the four major categories of the income statement: continuing operations, discontinued operations, extraordinary items, and net income.

Calculation
Preferred stock rights have precedence over common stock. Therefore, dividends on preferred shares are subtracted before calculating the EPS. When preferred shares are cumulative (i.e. dividends accumulate as payable if unpaid in the given accounting year), annual 

al dividends are deducted whether or not they have been declared. Dividends in arrears are not relevant when calculating EPS.

Basic formula
Earnings per share = 

Net income formula
Earnings per share = 

Continuing operations formula
Earnings per share =

Diluted earnings per share
Diluted earnings per share (diluted EPS) is a company's earnings per share calculated using fully diluted shares outstanding (i.e. including the impact of stock option grants and convertible bonds). Diluted EPS indicates a "worst case" scenario, one that reflects the issuance of stock for all outstanding options, warrants and convertible securities that would reduce earnings per share.

Calculations
Calculations of diluted EPS vary. Morningstar reports diluted EPS "Earnings/Share $", which is net income minus preferred stock dividends divided by the weighted average of common stock shares outstanding over the past year; this is adjusted for dilutive shares. Some data sources may simplify this calculation by using the number of shares outstanding at the end of a reporting period. The methods of simplifying EPS calculations and eliminating inappropriate assumptions include replacing primary EPS with basic EPS, eliminating the treasury stock method of accounting from fully diluted EPS, eliminating the three-percent test for dual presentation, and providing information on individual dilative securities.

U.S. GAAP
Calculations of diluted EPS under U.S. GAAP are described under Statement No. 128 of the Financial Accounting Standards Board (FAS No. 128). The objective of diluted EPS is to measure the performance of a company over the reporting period taking into account the dilutive effect of potential common stock that could be issued by the company.  To compute diluted EPS, both the denominator (outstanding shares) and the numerator (earnings) may need to be adjusted.

Diluted shares: 
To calculate the total number of shares used in the calculation, FASB prescribes using the treasury method to calculate the dilutive effect of any instruments that could result in the issuance of shares, including:
 Stock options
 Warrants
 Convertible preferred stock
 Convertible bonds
 Share-based payment arrangements
 Written put options
 Contingently issuable shares

Earnings: 
The numerator used in calculating diluted EPS is adjusted to take into account the impact that the conversion of any securities would have on earnings.  For example, interest would be added back to earnings to reflect the conversion of any outstanding convertible bonds, preferred dividends would be added back to reflect the conversion of convertible preferred stock, and any impact of these changes on other financial items, such as royalties and taxes, would also be adjusted.

International financial reporting standards
Under International Financial Reporting Standards, diluted earnings per share is calculated by adjusting the earnings and number of shares for the effects of dilutive options and other dilutive potential common stock. Dilutive potential common stock includes:
 convertible debt
 convertible preferred stock
 share warrants
 share options
 share rights
 Employee stock purchase plans
 contractual rights to purchase shares
 contingent issuance contracts or agreement

See also
Accretion/dilution analysis
Dilutive security
P/E ratio
Whisper number

References

External links
European banks’ earnings announcements, video
Earnings Per Share Screener-  figures from official financial statements
Price-To-Earning Ratio calculator

Corporate finance
Fundamental analysis
Financial ratios